Victorian or Victorians may refer to:

19th century 
 Victorian era, British history during Queen Victoria's 19th-century reign
 Victorian architecture
 Victorian house
 Victorian decorative arts
 Victorian fashion
 Victorian literature
 Victorian morality
 Victoriana

Other 
 The Victorians, a 2009 British documentary
 Victorian, a resident of the state of Victoria, Australia
 Victorian, a resident of the provincial capital city of Victoria, British Columbia, Canada
 RMS Victorian, a ship
 Saint Victorian (disambiguation), various saints
 Victorian (horse)
 Victorian Football Club (disambiguation), either of two defunct Australian rules football clubs

See also 
 Neo-Victorian, a late 20th century aesthetic movement
 Queen Victoria
 Victoria (disambiguation)
 The Victorians (disambiguation)